Alberobello (literally "beautiful tree";) is a small town and comune of the Metropolitan City of Bari, Apulia, southern Italy. It has 10,237 inhabitants (2022) and is famous for its unique trullo buildings. The trulli of Alberobello have been designated as a UNESCO World Heritage site since 1996.

History
A first occupation of the area started only in the early sixteenth century on the impulse of the Count of Conversano Andrea Matteo III Acquaviva d'Aragona. He allowed about forty peasant families from Noci to settle here and cultivate the land, with the obligation to give him the tenth of the crops.

In 1635 his successor, Count Giangirolamo II (1600–1665) erected an inn with a tavern and an oratory and started the urbanization of the forest with the construction of few small houses. The expansion of the urban area was helped by the abundance of limestone, karst and calcareous sedimentary, and by the permission of the count to build houses only with dry walls without the use of mortar, which would become the peculiar trulli. This obligation to have houses built with dry stones was an expedient of the count to avoid paying taxes to the Spanish viceroy of the Kingdom of Naples. The centre of Alberobello was built on the streets of the ancient river Cana, where is now the largo Giuseppe Martelotta.

Alberobello remained a fief of the Acquaviva of Aragon until 27 May 1797, when King Ferdinand IV of Bourbon elevated the small village to the royal city, freeing it from the feudal servitude of the counts. On 22 June 1797, the first mayor Francesco Giuseppe Lippolis was elected.

Alberobello is the only inhabited center with an entire district of trulli, and is considered to be the cultural capital of the trulli of the Itria Valley.

The Trulli of Alberobello 

The history of the trulli (from Ancient greek τρούλλοι) is linked to the Prammatica De Baronibus, an edict of the 15th-century Kingdom of Naples that subjected every new settlement to a tribute. In 1481 the Counts of Conversano D'Acquaviva D'Aragona from 1481, owners of the territory of Alberobello, then imposed on the residents that they built their dwellings dry, without using mortars, so that they could be configured as precarious buildings and easily demolished.

Having to use only stones, the peasants found in the round form with self-supporting domed roof the simplest configuration. The roofs were embellished with decorative pinnacles representing the signature of the architect (''master ).

International relations

 
Alberobello is twinned with:
 Shirakawa-go, Japan
 Gokayama, Japan
 Monte Sant'Angelo, Italy, since 2013
 Andria, Italy
 Harran, Turkey, since 2013

During the Italian diaspora, a large number of Alberobellesei emigrated to Utica, New York.

References

External links 

 Official website
 Alberobello.com
 Alberobello Tourism

Cities and towns in Apulia
World Heritage Sites in Italy
Populated places established in 1635